Juan Manuel "Jay" Gonzalez (born January 8, 1971) is an American politician who served as Secretary of Administration and Finance of Massachusetts under Governor Deval Patrick from 2009 to 2013. A member of the Democratic Party, he was the nominee for Governor of Massachusetts in 2018.

Gonzalez was appointed to his secretary position after the resignation of Leslie Kirwan in the fall of 2009. He was succeeded by Glen Shor in January 2013. Before working as a government official, Gonzalez was an attorney at Edwards Angell Palmer & Dodge in Boston. He attended Dartmouth College and Georgetown University Law Center.

Career
Gonzalez was born and raised in Cleveland, Ohio.  After graduating from Dartmouth College and Georgetown Law School, Gonzalez worked at a law firm in Cleveland. He then moved to Boston to work for Palmer & Dodge where he specialized in public finance.

Gonzalez worked on Deval Patrick's 2006 gubernatorial campaign. He then joined Patrick's administration in 2007 as Deputy Secretary of Administration and Finance of Massachusetts. He was appointed Secretary of Administration and Finance of Massachusetts in 2009. He also served as Chairman of the Board of the Massachusetts Health Connector, where he oversaw implementation of Massachusetts’ health care reform, and he co-chaired the Massachusetts Life Sciences Center.

Gonzalez left the cabinet in 2013. Gonzalez served as chair of the Massachusetts Board of Early Education and Care. Gonzalez later served as president and CEO of CeltiCare Health and New Hampshire Healthy Families.

On January 30, 2017 he announced he would run for governor in the 2018 Massachusetts election. He defeated Bob Massie, an entrepreneur and sustainability advocate from Somerville, to become the Democratic nominee in the race.

As a former Brookline resident, Gonzalez was an elected Town Meeting Member, Co-Chair of the Town Meeting Members Association, and a member of the Advisory Committee in the Town of Brookline Gonzalez currently serves on the boards of the Dimock Center, Project Hope, and the Trust for Public Land.

On June 2, 2018, at the Democratic State Convention, Gonzalez won 70% of the vote, securing the endorsement of the state party. Gonzalez lost the general election, securing 886,281 votes to incumbent Charlie Baker's 1,781,982. In April 2019, Gonzalez joined the law firm Hinckley, Allen, & Snyder LLP as a partner in the firm's Boston office.

In 2021, Gonzalez served as a co-chair of the committee overseeing Michelle Wu's transition into the office of mayor of Boston.

Personal life
Jay Gonzalez grew up in Cleveland, Ohio. Gonzalez moved to Massachusetts in 1998. His mother dropped out of college when he was born, and his father was a Spanish immigrant who worked as a bricklayer.

Gonzalez lives with his wife, Cyndi, in the Jamaica Plain neighborhood of Boston, and he has two daughters, Isabel and Abby.

References

External links
 Jay Gonzalez for Governor

|-

1971 births
American people of Spanish descent
Dartmouth College alumni
Georgetown University Law Center alumni
Candidates in the 2018 United States elections
Lawyers from Cleveland
Living people
Massachusetts Democrats
Massachusetts lawyers
Massachusetts Secretaries of Administration and Finance
Politicians from Needham, Massachusetts
Politicians from Cleveland